75 Ark is a hip hop record label based in San Francisco, California. It was created in 1998 when Toni Isabella, Anne Cook, along with Erik Gilbert and Rachel Matthews of Asphodel Records, left to form and run 75 Ark. NicheMusic was the parent company of 75 Ark, founded by David S Schulhof.  In June 2000, 75 Ark became the first record label to sign a deal with Napster.

In 2002, Erik Gilbert formed Coup d'État Entertainment. However, this label never achieved the level of success as 75 Ark.

Artists

Dr. Octagon
Antipop Consortium
The Nextmen
The Coup
Deltron 3030
Lovage

See also
List of record labels

References

External links
75 Ark at Discogs

American record labels
Record labels disestablished in 2001
Hip hop record labels